The name Darby has been used for eight tropical cyclones in the Eastern Pacific Ocean.

 Tropical Storm Darby (1980) – did not affect land
 Tropical Storm Darby (1986) – remained at sea, remnants affected Arizona and California
 Hurricane Darby (1992) – Category 3 hurricane, remained well offshore but caused minor damage in Mexico and California
 Hurricane Darby (1998) – Category 3 hurricane, never affected land
 Hurricane Darby (2004) – Category 3 hurricane, remnants affected the Hawaiian Islands
 Hurricane Darby (2010) – Category 3 hurricane, dissipated off the coast of southern Mexico
 Hurricane Darby (2016) – Category 3 hurricane, made landfall on the Island of Hawaii as a tropical storm
 Hurricane Darby (2022) – Category 4 hurricane, churned in the open ocean and dissipated south of the Island of Hawaii.

Pacific hurricane set index articles